The Maritime Medal 1940–1945 was a Belgian bravery award of World War II, established by Royal Decree on 17 July 1941 and awarded to members of the Belgian Navy, merchant navy or fishing fleet for acts of heroism in the saving of ships or lives during an action against the enemy.

The award's statute was later amended to include all naval personnel for service of two years or more aboard an allied warship (most often aboard a Royal Navy ship) and to those who had been shipwrecked twice due to combat actions.

Award description
The Maritime Medal 1940–1945 is a 38mm in diameter circular bronze medal.  Its obverse bears the relief image of a "lion rampant".  On the reverse, the royal cypher of King Leopold III.
Atop the medal, the suspension loop is in the form of a ribbon with a bow.

The medal is suspended by a ring through the suspension loop from a 38mm wide ocean green silk moiré ribbon.  There are six 1mm wide white stripes, three at left and three at right separated by 3mm each starting 3mm from the ribbon's edges.  Miniature crossed bronze sea anchors are affixed to the ribbon, sizes vary greatly depending on maker.

Notable recipients (partial list)
The individuals listed below were awarded the Maritime Medal 1940–1945:
Divisional Admiral Léon Lurquin
Aviator Vice Admiral Sir André Schlim
Commodore Georges Timmermans
Captain Henri Teugels
Seaman 1st class Maurice Mommens
Seaman AB Leopold-Gaspard Sabbe +08.05.1995

See also

 List of Orders, Decorations and Medals of the Kingdom of Belgium
 and

References

Other sources
 Quinot H., 1950, Recueil illustré des décorations belges et congolaises, 4e Edition. (Hasselt)
 Cornet R., 1982, Recueil des dispositions légales et réglementaires régissant les ordres nationaux belges. 2e Ed. N.pl.,  (Brussels)
 Borné A.C., 1985, Distinctions honorifiques de la Belgique, 1830–1985 (Brussels)

External links
Bibliothèque royale de Belgique (In French)
Les Ordres Nationaux Belges (In French)
ARS MORIENDI Notables from Belgian history (In French and Dutch)

1941 establishments in Belgium
Military awards and decorations of Belgium
Awards established in 1941
Merchant navy